Polypodiopteris is a genus of ferns in the family Polypodiaceae, subfamily Drynarioideae, according to the Pteridophyte Phylogeny Group classification of 2016 (PPG I).

Taxonomy
Polypodiopteris was first described by C.F. Reed in 1948.

Species
In the Pteridophyte Phylogeny Group classification of 2016 (PPG I), the genus has three species. , the Checklist of Ferns and Lycophytes of the World placed all three in a more broadly circumscribed genus Selliguea:
Polypodiopteris brachypodia (Copel.) C.F.Reed
Polypodiopsis colorata (Copel.) Copel.
Polypodiopsis proavita (Copel.) Copel.
, Plants of the World Online also sank the genus into Selliguea.

References

Polypodiaceae
Fern genera